The Party of United Communists of Albania (PKBSH) was a political party in Albania. The secretary of the Central Committee of the party was Muharrem Xhafa. PKBSH was formed on 5 June 1999 through the merger of the Communist Reconstruction Party and the New Albanian Party of Labour.

In the 2001 parliamentary elections, PKBSH won 0.22% of the votes.

In 2002 the party merged with a faction of the Communist Party of Albania (PKSH) to form the refounded Albanian Party of Labour (PPSH).

Defunct political parties in Albania
Communist parties in Albania
Anti-revisionist organizations
Political parties established in 1999
1999 establishments in Albania
Political parties disestablished in 2002
2002 disestablishments in Albania